Nathan Belcher (June 23, 1813 – June 2, 1891) was a United States representative from Connecticut. He was born in Preston, Connecticut. He completed academic studies and was graduated from Amherst College in 1832. Later, he studied law at the Cambridge Law School before being admitted to the bar in 1836. He commenced practice in Clinton, Connecticut before he moved in 1841 to New London, Connecticut where he engaged in manufacturing tools, hardware, and kitchen utensils.

Belcher was a member of the Connecticut House of Representatives 1846 and 1847 and also served in the Connecticut Senate in 1850. He was elected as a Democrat to the Thirty-third Congress (March 4, 1853 – March 3, 1855) and was not a candidate for renomination in 1854. He resumed his former manufacturing pursuits and also engaged in banking. Belcher died in New London, Connecticut in 1891 and was buried in Cedar Grove Cemetery.

References

1813 births
1891 deaths
Democratic Party members of the Connecticut House of Representatives
Amherst College alumni
People from Clinton, Connecticut
People from Preston, Connecticut
Politicians from New London, Connecticut
Democratic Party members of the United States House of Representatives from Connecticut
19th-century American politicians